Hear Me Move is the first South African "Sbujwa" dance film which was released in 2015 on Ster-Kinekor Cinemas and internationally.

Plot 
Muzi, born and raised in Johannesburg, South Africa, is the son of a famous street dancer who is in pursuit to find the truth about his father's death. He teams up with his father's dance partner "Shoes", who encourages him to take heed of his dance talent, but finds himself in a challenge that pushes him to his limits.

Following on his father's footsteps, Muzi is a street dancer. He struggles to keep his promise to his mother of not dancing again following the death of his father. He finds himself in a dilemma of finding the truth about his father's death or disappoint his mother by joining Shoe's dance crew to continue dancing. Eventually he joins the dance crew, a culprit action that leads him to become an enemy of "Prince", the crew leader of a new dance crew that is making waves in the city.

Cast 
 Nyaniso Dzedze as Muzi
 Wandile Molebatsi as Thami Skhulu
 Makhaola Ndebele as Shoes
 Amanda Du-Pont
 Boity Thulo
 Khanyi Mbau
 Thembi Seeti
 Lorcia Cooper
 Bontle Modiselle
 Mbuso Kgarebe

Production 
The film was directed by Scottnes L. Smith and produced by Fidel Namisi and Wandile Molebatsi. Fidel Namisi wrote the screenplay and Zethu Mashika composed the score. It was produced in Johannesburg by Coal Stove Pictures.

Release 
The film was released nationwide in South Africa on 27 February 2015 at Ster-Kinekor Cinemas. The film also had international screening via Afrostream network in different countries including the United States.

Reception 
Hear Me Move was well received with more positive comments from film reviews. It received 5 nominations at the 12th Africa Movie Academy Awards, including awards for Most Promising Actor, Best Supporting Actress, Best Soundtrack, Best Editing and Best Visual Effects.

Box office
Hear Me Move is reported to have Box Office Gross of US§ 43,000 as of 15 March 2015.

References

External links 
 
 http://www.mytvnews.co.za/hear-me-move-2015-film-now-at-cinema/
 http://mg.co.za/article/2015-03-12-upbeat-audience-for-hear-me-move
 http://ewn.co.za/2015/02/27/Landmark-dance-film-Hear-Me-Move-hits-SA-big-screen

2014 films
English-language South African films
2010s English-language films